State Street  may refer to:

Streets and locations
State Street (Chicago), Illinois
State Street (Boston), Massachusetts
State Street (Ann Arbor), Michigan
State Street (Albany), New York
State Street (Manhattan), New York
House at No. 8 State Street, Mount Morris in Livingston County, New York
State Street Historic District (Rochester, New York)
State Street (Salt Lake County), Utah
State Street (Madison), Wisconsin

Financial organizations
State Street Bank and Trust Company, a subsidiary of State Street Corporation, a large custodian bank
State Street Corporation, a financial services holding company; the parent primarily focuses on servicing institutional investment clients
State Street Global Advisors, the investment management division of State Street Corporation

See also 
State Street Bank v. Signature Financial Group, a US court decision relating to a business method patent
State Street station (disambiguation)